Dialeucias is a genus of moths in the family Erebidae first described by George Hampson in 1901.

Species
Dialeucias pallidistriata
Dialeucias variegata
Dialeucias violascens

References

External links

Phaegopterina
Moth genera